The Yuba City Bears were a summer collegiate baseball team based in Marysville, California, in the United States and representing Yuba City, California. They were a member of the Great West League, having been established in 2017, and had played their home games at Colusa Casino Stadium adjacent to Ellis Lake, in Marysville.  They had shared the facilities with the Yuba-Sutter Gold Sox, but have since folded their GWL operations.

Team history

The Yuba City Bears collegiate woodbat team gets its name from a former minor league baseball team that played from 1932 to 1949.  They were founded to bring back a natural rivalry with the Marysville Gold Sox as the original Bears and Marysville Giants competed during that time.

On November 7, 2017, the GWL announced that the Bears were not going to play in 2018 and have since been replaced by the San Francisco Seals.

Year-by-year record

Coaching staff
 Jeramy Gillen - Head Coach
 Stuart Bradley - Assistant Coach
 Brandon Asher - Assistant Coach
 Marc Giampaoli - Athletic Trainer

Radio broadcasts
The Yuba City Bears official flagship radio station is KETQ-LP 93.3 in Yuba City and Marysville.

References

External links
 Yuba City Bears official website

Amateur baseball teams in California
Marysville, California
Yuba City, California
Sports in Yuba County, California
Companies based in Yuba County, California
College baseball leagues in the United States
2017 establishments in California
Baseball teams established in 2017